The 2011–12 North Carolina Tar Heels men's basketball team represented the University of North Carolina at Chapel Hill in the 2011–2012 college basketball season. The team's head coach was Roy Williams, who was in his 9th season as UNC's head men's basketball coach. The 2011–12 North Carolina team finished the regular season with a final record of 32–6, and with a 14–2 record in ACC regular season play, winning the conference regular season championship outright. They were invited to the 2012 ACC men's basketball tournament, where they beat Maryland and North Carolina State before falling to Florida State in the championship game. They were also invited to the 2012 NCAA Division I men's basketball tournament reaching the Elite Eight where they were defeated by Kansas. This was the second time UNC lost to Kansas in the NCAA Tournament with Roy Williams as UNC head coach. Roy Williams previously coached Kansas from 1988–2003. Kansas later fell to Kentucky 59-67 in the National Championship Game. The Tar Heels won their previous three games in the NCAA Tournament by an average of 13.7 points. In the second-round game versus Creighton, starting UNC point guard Kendall Marshall broke his right wrist with 10:56 remaining in the second half. Kendall Marshall did not play in UNC's two following games in the NCAA Tournament, a 73-65 overtime win over Ohio in the Sweet 16 and a 67-80 loss to Kansas in the Elite Eight. The loss to Kansas was UNC's second straight loss in the Elite Eight, after losing to Kentucky the year before.

Pre-season

Departures

Class of 2011 Signees

Roster

Note that the roster is subject to change.

Season

Non-conference play
The Tar Heels started out as a near-unanimous #1 in all major polls.  They opened the season against Michigan State in the inaugural Carrier Classic, which they won handily 67–55.  They were not seriously tested until the finals of the 2011 Las Vegas Invitational, in which they were upset by UNLV 90–80.  After a close win over Wisconsin and an equally close loss to Kentucky, they made it relatively unscathed through the rest of the nonconference slate, with the only close game being against Long Beach State.

Conference play
The ACC schedule opened with dominating wins over Boston College and Miami.  However, in their third conference game, the Tar Heels suffered a 90–57 flogging at the hands of Florida State — easily the worst loss Williams had suffered in his nine years in Chapel Hill.  They quickly rebounded and won their next five games with relative ease.  They were well on their way to making Duke their sixth straight victim, but Duke came back from 10 points down with two minutes to go to win the game on an Austin Rivers 3-pointer at the buzzer.

The Tar Heels would not lose again for the rest of the season, though they got a scare from Virginia before hanging on for a 54–51 win.  An easy win over Maryland set up the seventh winner-take-all game in the 93-year history of the Carolina-Duke rivalry, with the winner clinching the ACC regular-season title and the number-one seed in the 2012 ACC tournament.  The Tar Heels dominated from start to finish, leading by as much as 26 before going on to an 88–70 win—in the process, winning their 29th ACC regular season title and their fifth outright title in eight years.

Schedule

|-
!colspan=12 style=| Exhibition
|-

|-
!colspan=12 style=| Regular season

|-
!colspan=9 style=| ACC tournament

|-
!colspan=9 style=| NCAA tournament

Rankings

Team players drafted into the NBA

References

North Carolina
North Carolina Tar Heels men's basketball seasons
North Carolina
Tar
Tar